Gamma Leporis, Latinized from γ Leporis, is a star in the south central part of the constellation Lepus, southeast of Beta Leporis and southwest of Delta Leporis. With an apparent visual magnitude of 3.587, it is bright enough to be seen with the naked eye. It has a common proper motion companion, AK Leporis, which is a variable star of the BY Draconis type and has an average brightness of magnitude 6.28. Gamma Leporis is a member of the Ursa Major Moving Group.

Gamma Leporis is an F-type main-sequence star with a stellar classification of F6 V. It is larger than the Sun with 1.2 times the radius of the Sun and 1.3 times the Sun's mass. The star is around 1.3 billion years old and is spinning with a rotation period of about six days. Based upon its stellar characteristics and distance from Earth, Gamma Leporis was considered a high-priority target for NASA's Terrestrial Planet Finder mission. It has been examined for an infrared excess, but none has been observed.

See also
 List of star systems within 25–30 light-years

References

External links 
 Overview on Gamma Leporis
 NASA NStars Database
 Stellar Database

F-type main-sequence stars
Binary stars
Triple star systems
Leporis, Gamma
Ursa Major Moving Group

Lepus (constellation)
Leporis, Gamma
Durchmusterung objects
Leporis, 13
0216
038393
027072
1983